Joe Hargreaves may refer to:
 Joe Hargreaves (footballer, fl. 1912–1924), English footballer for Bradford City
 Joe Hargreaves (footballer, born 1915) (1915–1992), English football forward for Rossendale United, Rochdale and Stalybridge Celtic